Desert News may refer to:

 Mojave Desert News, a newspaper published in California City, California
 Deseret News, a newspaper published in Salt Lake City, Utah

See also
 
 News desert